The year 1891 in archaeology involved some significant events.

Explorations
 Brahmagiri first explored by Benjamin L. Rice.

Excavations
 Peabody Museum (Harvard) - Harvard University project at Copan begins.
 Flinders Petrie works on the temple of Aten at Tell-el-Amarna, discovering a  New Kingdom painted pavement.
 J. Theodore Bent works at Great Zimbabwe.

Finds
 May 28 - Gundestrup cauldron, found in Himmerland, Denmark.

Paleontology
 October - Eugène Dubois finds the first fragmentary bones of Pithecanthropus erectus (later redesignated Homo erectus), or 'Java Man', at Trinil on the Solo River.
 The Saqqara Bird.

Publications
 Coins of Ancient India by Sir Alexander Cunningham.
 Dorset Ooser first published.

Births

Deaths

References

Archaeology
Archaeology by year
Archaeology
Archaeology